The Ducati Desmosedici is a four-stroke V4 engine racing motorcycle made by Ducati for MotoGP racing. The series nomenclature is GP with the two-digit year appended, such as Desmosedici GP10 for 2010. In 2006 Ducati made a short production run of 1,500 street-legal variants, the Desmosedici RR.

Background 
Ducati abandoned the Grand Prix racing scene at the start of the 1970s. For many years the 500 class was essentially a class for two-stroke motorcycles, an engineering technology that was far removed from the four-stroke road-going machines sold by Ducati. Technical rules changed in 2002, giving priority to four-stroke machinery and turning the 500 class of World Road Racing into the MotoGP Championship. This convinced Ducati to make a much-awaited return to the track in the new MotoGP class.

Ducati history is classically based on 90° V-twin (or L-twin) engines, using desmodromic valve technology. Initially, Ducati considered the possibility of creating a MotoGP 'super-twin', taking advantage of the MotoGP regulations that give twin-cylinder machines a considerable weight reduction over four, five or six-cylinder bikes. However, analysis indicated that a twin-cylinder engine would not have been able to produce the required amount of power, without excessively increasing the number of revs. A twin would have had to rev at over 17,000 rpm, but this would require a very short stroke and a very large bore, as a result producing possible combustion problems.

The basis of the design of the Desmosedici engine therefore is two classical Ducati L-twins next to each other, making a Double L-twin with two-cylinder Stroking at the same time (also called Twin Pulse). With four valves per cylinder, the total number of valves is sixteen – Desmosedici means desmodromic distribution with sixteen valves shortened in Italian.

Design had started in 2001, the bike was unveiled at the 2002 Italian GP at Mugello, for use in the following seasons MotoGP World Championship. Vittoriano Guareschi, the Ducati Corse test-rider, followed every phase of the Desmosedici's development process from early testing to track debut and the project's evolution. In 2007, Ducati's pilot Casey Stoner, riding a Desmosedici, obtained Ducati's first MotoGP World Championship title.

In early 2021, Ducati rider Johann Zarco set the highest trap speed record in competition practice on the Desmosedici.

GP3 
While still fully committed to Superbike racing, the Ducati Marlboro Team of Loris Capirossi and Troy Bayliss would compete in all rounds of the 2003 MotoGP championship. The Desmosedici GP3 quickly scored a series of results with Loris Capirossi, who stepped onto the podium in the opening round of the championship in Japan and won the GP Catalunya in Barcelona. Riders Capirossi finished fourth in the final championship standings and Bayliss sixth; while Ducati finished second overall in the Manufacturers' standings.

GP4 
In 2004 the Desmosedici GP4, again in the hands of Capirossi and Bayliss, underwent a series of major modifications. A large part of the season went by before the bike became competitive, but the season concluded with both riders on the podium.

GP5 

The GP5 version lined up for Ducati's third season in MotoGP, with Bayliss replaced by the Spanish rider Carlos Checa. Thanks to a collaboration agreement with Bridgestone, Ducati could finally contribute to the development of new tyres and by the end of the season the Desmosedici became a competitive machine. Bridgestone found that hard tyres suited the bike more than softer tyres to create grip, allowing it to spin the rear wheel gave better control. Capirossi took two wins in the Grand Prix of Japan at Motegi and in the Malaysian GP at Sepang, while Checa scored a brace of podium finishes.

GP6 
Launched at the Italian skiing resort of Madonna di Campiglio, the GP6 is a lighter and more powerful version of the GP5. Involving better aerodynamics and a better fuel tank position, most importantly, although more powerful, the engine delivery was smoothened to make the bike more rideable. This made the bike slower on top speed, but quicker into, around and out of corners.

The new rider with Capirossi was Spanish rider Sete Gibernau. After encouraging winter tests, the Desmosedici GP6 took its first win of 2006 in the opening GP at Jerez de la Frontera, Spain, followed by a podium in Qatar. Capirossi led the championship for a short while, but at the start of the Grand prix de Catalunya at Barcelona, Gibernau's bike collided with Capirossi's after Gibernau braked too late and compressed his brake lever further after impacting it on the back of Capirossi's bike. Both riders ended up injured and in the hospital, with Gibernau sustaining a broken collar bone, and both missed the Dutch Grand Prix at Assen. Capirossi returned at the British Grand Prix, while Gibernau was replaced by German Alex Hofmann for the Dutch Grand Prix, the British Grand Prix, and also the Czech Grand Prix after undergoing additional surgery. With Gibernau  sidelined for the final round of the season at Valencia following a collision with Casey Stoner, Ducati recalled Bayliss, who was recently crowned World Superbike champion. The race was won by Bayliss, his first MotoGP victory, with Capirossi taking second place for the first Ducati 1–2 finish.

GP7 
For 2007, MotoGP rules were changed to cap motors to a maximum displacement of 800 cc. In response, Ducati built the GP7. Its specifications were: 800 cc bike, double L-Twin motor (4 Cylinder Twin Pulse).

Ducati started its project to build an 800 cc MotoGP bike extremely early and according to Ducati's racing chief Filippo Preziosi, by August 2006 Ducati had already built twenty 800 cc engines with various specifications. In addition, an early version of the bike was track tested for the first time during early May 2006. Public testing with the bike began at the Brno Track, where Loris Capirossi had won the day before riding the GP6, on the 21st of August. Capirossi's lap times on the prototype GP7 were only 1.4 seconds off his track record time set on the 990 cc GP6.

Further testing of the GP7 in Motegi, Japan, revealed that the 800 cc machine could run faster laps than the higher-displacement 990 cc bikes, and held nearly a second advantage over the next fastest 800 cc bike, a Honda ridden by Dani Pedrosa.

MotoGP's 800 cc era officially began with the first race of the 2007 MotoGP season, at the Losail International Circuit in Qatar. Casey Stoner won the race on the new GP7. The bike had a clear top speed advantage over the rest of the grid, due to its higher output motor. A new track record was set on the GP7. Second place contender and five time World champion, Yamaha's Valentino Rossi, realised that "unfortunately, there was too much difference between (our) bikes in the straight" and "Our Yamaha will never go as quick on a straight as the Ducati." These words turned out to be true, as the GP7 enjoyed a top speed advantage throughout the season, although the other manufacturers (Yamaha, Honda, Kawasaki and Suzuki) closed the gap significantly by the end of the year. Stoner and his Bridgestone-shod Ducati proved to be the top combination in MotoGP and he won the world championship at Motegi, Japan, on September 23, 2007, four races before the end of the season.

GP8 

An update of the GP7 design, Ducati's entry for the 2008 MotoGP World Championship was tested first in February 2007.

For purposes of avoiding chatter which was encountered on some occasions with GP7, the rigidity of the GP8's frame was altered, although further details of relevant modifications are not disclosed. In addition, in an attempt to reduce an effect described as "pumping", some modifications to the bike's suspension geometry were made.

As with its predecessor the GP8 contains a four-cylinder 800 cc engine with desmodromic actuation of its 16 valves. The engine has improved mid-range response and top-end power compared to that of the GP7.

Throughout 2007, Ducati tested a special fuel-saving clutch arrangement which disengaged the clutch during braking and reduced fuel consumption, however the arrangement was not incorporated in the GP8 as various advanced lubricants and fuels used with the GP8 are believed to provide comparable fuel savings, while decreasing internal engine friction and increasing maximum power.

GP9 
The GP9 was Ducati's entry for the 2009 MotoGP World Championship. Ducati began testing it on track prior to May 2008.  On 9 June 2008, Ducati publicly rolled out the Desmosedici GP9 for testing at Circuit de Catalunya.

A distinctive feature of GP9 is its carbon fibre chassis, representing a departure from Ducati's traditional steel trellis chassis. Although carbon fibre chassis were tried in mid 1980s, currently no other MotoGP racing team uses them.

GP10 
On January 15, 2010, Ducati introduced the GP10 for the 2010 MotoGP season. Development concentrated on improving engine longevity, to keep within new engine restrictions, and rideability. Most notably, the GP10 makes use of a big-bang firing order for the first time since the Desmosedici changed from the 990 cc to the 800 cc engine capacity. Ducati also redesigned the fairing, first seen at the 2009 Estoril round.

GP11 
On January 12, 2011, Ducati introduced the GP11 for the 2011 MotoGP season. The bike was raced by Valentino Rossi and Nicky Hayden.

GP12 
On March 19, 2012, Ducati unveiled the GP12 for the 2012 Grand Prix motorcycle racing season which incorporated new displacement standards of up to 1,000 cc in capacity. The bike was raced by Valentino Rossi and Nicky Hayden.

GP16 
The Desmosedici GP16 was unveiled in February 2016. It ran the first two pre-season tests with race riders Andrea Dovizioso and Andrea Iannone without a livery. Ducati's MotoGP boss Gigi Dall'Igna describes the 2016 Desmosedici as an "evolution" of its recent challengers. The GP16 was still the fastest bike in a straight line with its extra power. The winglets remained from the previous year, albeit now coloured to match the predominantly white and red Desmosedici.

In the 10th round of the season in Austria, Ducati dominated all sessions. Andrea Iannone and Andrea Dovizioso qualified 1st and 3rd respectively. In the race, Ducati used their lack of wheelies and extra power to stretch out a gap to Jorge Lorenzo after some laps. The two bikes stayed together, with Dovizioso in first for most of the race. But Iannone out-braked him and took the lead into the penultimate corner of the last lap. The win was the first for Iannone in MotoGP and his first since Moto2 Italy 2012. The win was the first for Ducati (and any other manufacturer than Honda or Yamaha) since Casey Stoner won for the team in 2010 Australian Grand Prix. Dovizioso finished in 2nd place to mark the first Ducati 1–2 finish since the 2007 Australian Grand Prix.

In the 17th round of the season at the newly resurfaced Sepang International Circuit in Malaysia, Dovizioso took his second pole of the year in wet conditions. At the start, he fell back to 4th while Iannone, who had qualified in 6th place, led briefly before falling to 2nd place. He stayed there till he crashed at Turn 9. That left Valentino Rossi with Dovizioso at the front and Jorge Lorenzo in a distant 3rd place. Rossi ran wide at turn 1 some laps later and fell back by around 1+ seconds per lap. 'DesmoDovi' held on for his first win with Ducati and his first win since his victory at Donington Park with the Repsol Honda Team in 2009.

Desmosedici RR 

The Desmosedici RR is a road-legal version of the Desmosedici, first delivered in early 2008.

Complete MotoGP results

Motorcycle summary
These results are accurate up to the 2022 Valencian Community motorcycle Grand Prix.

World Championship titles:
Riders: 2 (Casey Stoner , Francesco Bagnaia )
Teams: 3 (Ducati Marlboro Team , Ducati Lenovo Team , Ducati Lenovo Team )
Constructors: 4

Races won: 70
2003: Capirossi 1 (1 in total)
2005: Capirossi 2 (2 in total)
2006: Capirossi 3, Bayliss 1 (4 in total)
2007: Stoner 10, Capirossi 1 (11 in total)
2008: Stoner 6 (6 in total)
2009: Stoner 4 (4 in total)
2010: Stoner 3 (3 in total)
2016: Iannone 1, Dovizioso 1 (2 in total)
2017: Dovizioso 6 (6 in total)
2018: Dovizioso 4, Lorenzo 3 (7 in total)
2019: Dovizioso 2, Petrucci 1 (3 in total)
2020: Dovizioso 1, Petrucci 1 (2 in total)
2021: Miller 2, Martín 1, Bagnaia 4 (7 in total)
2022: Bastianini 4, Bagnaia 7, Miller 1 (12 in total)

Poles: 71
2003: Capirossi 3 (3 in total)
2005: Capirossi 3 (3 in total)
2006: Capirossi 2, Gibernau 1 (3 in total)
2007: Stoner 5 (5 in total)
2008: Stoner 9 (9 in total)
2009: Stoner 3 (3 in total)
2010: Stoner 4 (4 in total)
2014: Dovizioso 1 (1 in total)
2015: Dovizioso 1, Iannone 1 (2 in total)
2016: Dovizioso 2, Iannone 1 (3 in total)
2018: Lorenzo 4, Dovizioso 2, Miller 1 (7 in total)
2020: Zarco 1 (1 in total)
2021: Bagnaia 6, Martín 4, Zarco 1 (11 in total)
2022: Bagnaia 5, Martín 5, Zarco 2, Di Giannantonio 1, Bastianini 1, Miller 1, Bezzecchi 1 (16 in total)

Ducati Desmosedici results
(key) (results in bold indicate pole position; results in italics indicate fastest lap)

Notes
* Season still in progress.
1 Being his final MotoGP race, Capirossi switched numbers for Valencia as a memorial to his fallen countryman Marco Simoncelli, killed at Sepang, by racing with No. 58 that Simoncelli used, instead of his normal No. 65. He was still shown as No. 65 in official timing documentation.

See also 
 KTM RC16
 Aprilia RS-GP
 Honda RC213V
 Suzuki GSX-RR
 Yamaha YZR-M1

Notes

References

External links 

Ducati.com – The official manufacturer's website. Current model info, including online information, history, manuals and race team info (Italian/English)
Ducati GP6 Racing – official site for the Desmosedici GP6 race bike with team info

Desmosedici
Grand Prix motorcycles
Motorcycles introduced in 2003
Motorcycles introduced in 2004
Motorcycles introduced in 2005
Motorcycles introduced in 2006
Motorcycles introduced in 2007
Motorcycles introduced in 2008
Motorcycles introduced in 2009